Stone Academy was a private, for-profit vocational school in Connecticut focused on educating students for careers in the medical field. It had three branches: East Hartford, West Haven, and Waterbury, Connecticut.

References

External links
Official website

Schools in Connecticut

1864 establishments in Connecticut
2023 disestablishments in the United States